"You're Supposed to Be My Friend" is the second single released from the Cookies album by the Scottish indie rock band 1990s. It was released on October 30, 2006.

Music video
The video features Jackie and the other band members getting beaten up by screaming female fans, leaving them bleeding.

Track listings
CD
"You're Supposed to Be My Friend"
"Jingle Bells"
"You're Supposed to Be My Friend" (Music video)

7"
A. "You're Supposed to Be My Friend"
B. "Hot Feet"

In popular culture
This song is played in the 2010 movie Diary of a Wimpy Kid.
It was also played at the start of "Hell Hath No Fury", the fourth episode in the first series of Castle).

2006 singles
1990s (band) songs